The U.S. Afrobeats Songs chart is a standard record chart, ranking the most popular Afrobeats songs in the United States and it is published weekly by Billboard. The chart ranks the 50 most popular songs every week. It was established by Billboard, in association with Afro Nation, on 22 March 2022. The chart is compiled by Billboard, and Afro Nation. The chart is measured from leading audio and video music services, plus download sales from top music retailers. The first chart was published in the issue dated 29 March.

The first number-one song on the U.S Afrobeats Songs chart was "Love Nwantiti (Ah Ah Ah)" by CKay, on 29 March 2022. The current number one is "Calm Down" by Rema and Selena Gomez, which has spent 28 weeks at number one.

Number ones

2022

2023

References

External links
 Current Billboard U.S. Afrobeats Songs

Billboard charts
2022 establishments in the United States